The 1984 season was the Hawthorn Football Club's 60th season in the Victorian Football League and 83rd overall. Hawthorn entered the season as the defending VFL Premiers. Hawthorn qualified for their third consecutive finals series. Hawthorn qualified for their second consecutive Grand Final. It was the second time they advanced to the Grand Final in two consecutive seasons since 1976. They faced  in a rematch of last years Grand Final with a chance to repeat as premiers. Hawthorn led 68–45 at 3-quarter time but Essendon kicked 9 goals to 2 in the fourth quarter to run over the top and win 105–81. This was their first Grand Final loss since 1975.

Fixture

Premiership season

Finals series

Ladder

References

Hawthorn Football Club seasons